Lukashya is a constituency of the National Assembly of Zambia. It covers the southern part of Kasama and the towns of Bwacha, Chalula and Sopma in Kasama District of Northern Province.

List of MPs

References

Constituencies of the National Assembly of Zambia
1973 establishments in Zambia
Constituencies established in 1973